Juan Herrera Gil (born 1952) is a retired tennis player from Spain.

Tennis career

Juniors
As a junior, he won the French Open Boys' Singles title in 1970. In the final, he defeated Jacques Thamin in three sets.

Pro tour
As a professional, his best result came in 1971 at the Concurso Internacional de Puerta de Hierro in Madrid, where he won two matches before losing to Ion Țiriac 7–9 4–6 in the third round. The Romanian, a former world No. 8, would go on to win the title.

References

External links

1952 births
Living people
French Open junior champions
Spanish male tennis players
Sportspeople from Murcia
Grand Slam (tennis) champions in boys' singles
Tennis players from the Region of Murcia